The 1957–58 Cupa României was the 20th edition of Romania's most prestigious football cup competition.

The title was won by Ştiinţa Timişoara against Progresul București.

Format
The competition is an annual knockout tournament.

In the first round proper, two pots were made, first pot with Divizia A teams and other teams till 16 and the second pot with the rest of teams qualified in this phase. Each tie is played as a single leg.

It is the first season in the history of Cupa României when all the games are played on a neutral location.

If a match is drawn after 90 minutes, the game goes in extra time, and if the scored is still tight after 120 minutes, then a replay will be played.

From the first edition, the teams from Divizia A entered in competition in sixteen finals, rule which remained till today.

First round proper

|colspan=3 style="background-color:#FFCCCC;"|6 April 1958

|-
|colspan=3 style="background-color:#FFCCCC;"|15 April 1958

|-
|colspan=3 style="background-color:#FFCCCC;"|16 April 1958 — Replays

|}

Second round proper

|colspan=3 style="background-color:#FFCCCC;"|27 April 1958

|}

Quarter-finals 

|colspan=3 style="background-color:#FFCCCC;"|24 May 1958

|-
|colspan=3 style="background-color:#FFCCCC;"|25 May 1958

|-
|colspan=3 style="background-color:#FFCCCC;"|12 June 1958

|}

Semi-finals

|colspan=3 style="background-color:#FFCCCC;"|29 June 1958

|}

Final

References

External links
 romaniansoccer.ro
 Official site
 The Romanian Cup on the FRF's official site

Cupa României seasons
1957–58 in Romanian football
Romania